Gumnaami is a 2019 Indian Bengali-language Factual film based on the true events directed by Srijit Mukherji, which deals with the mystery of Netaji's death, based on the Mukherjee Commission hearings and the book Conundrum written by Anuj Dhar and Chandrachur Ghose. It has been produced by Shrikant Mohta, Pranay Ranjan, and Mahendra Soni under the banner of Shree Venkatesh Films. Prosenjit Chatterjee plays the roles of Subhas Chandra Bose and Gumnaami Baba.

The principal photography began in May 2019 in Asansol, West Bengal. The film was released theatrically on 2 October 2019. The film completes 50 days at the box-office. A huge success.

Plot
The film is based on the Mukherjee Commission hearings and shows a dramatized version of the works of Anuj Dhar, Chandrachur Ghose and the Mission Netaji voluntary organisation. The film shows the three theories trying to explain the death or disappearance of Subhas Chandra Bose.

The film starts with Subhas Chandra Bose at the Congress Conference. A courageous Subhas disagrees to follow the nonviolent methods of Gandhi and resigns from Indian National Congress. He then travels the world to make allies while confronting the British Army. In 2003, journalist Chandrachur Dhar (Anirban Bhattacharya) is given an assignment for writing a detailed report about the mystery surrounding Subhas Chandra Bose's death. He takes up the assignment and spends months to gather evidence and knowledge about Bose. His neglectful attitude towards his wife (Tanusree Chakraborty) compels her to divorce him. Mentally frustrated, Dhar quits his job and forms a group entirely dedicated to the purpose for solving the mystery.

At the 2005 Mukherjee Commission hearing, he addresses the jury boldly. According to him, there was no plane crash at all in 1945. Bose had preplanned to fake his death to the world and asked his most trustworthy soldier of the Indian National Army (INA) Habib ur Rahman (who later left the partitioned India and joined to higher posts in the Government of Pakistan, including the Additional Defense Secretary) to be with him and not to disclose his fake death to anyone. To support his statement, Dhar shows numerous evidences like why he went to a six-seater fighter plane when there were twelve-seater planes available, there were no recorded plane crash that year, and that there was no news of death of the Japanese soldiers who were supposed to have died in the plane crash.

The judge, seemingly convinced, asks that if the plane crash did not happen then where did Subhas go. Dhar reveals that Subhas lived as an ascetic in Uttar Pradesh without revealing his identity or face; the people who visited him could only see him behind a curtain. A few people recognised him as soon as they heard his voice. However, they never revealed it to any third person. Even his close colleague and revolutionary, Leela Roy and Samar Guha, recognised him when they visited him and later maintained correspondence. It is revealed that the family members knew he was alive. Numerous pieces of evidence were lying with them. He became known as 'Gumnaami Baba' and died in 1985. Only 13 disciples were present at the funeral.

The next day, the commission concludes that there was no plane crash and that Bose did not die in 1945. However, in 2006, the Government refused to accept the verdict and discarded the report. Angry and frustrated, Dhar burns all his work and contemplates the purpose of his hard work of 3 years. His former wife encourages him to fight as Bose did for the country for 30 years. They vow to keep on fighting till justice is served.

In a flashback, Subhas Chandra Bose is seen singing Subh Sukh Chain, the National Anthem of the Provisional Government of Free India, along with the Indian National Army.

Cast
 Anirban Bhattacharya as Chandrachur Dhar, based on Anuj Dhar and Chandrachur Ghose, the two eminent researchers on Netaji and his life events
 Prosenjit Chatterjee as Netaji Subhas Chandra Bose and Gumnami Baba
 Tanusree Chakraborty as Ronita Dhar
 Biplab Dasgupta as Mr. Paul
 Shyamal Chakraborty
 Surendra Rajan as Mahatma Gandhi
 Sanjay Gurbaxani as Jawaharlal Nehru
Anindya Sain as Anuj
 Akshay Kapoor as Srikant Sharma Kanha
 Satyam Bhattacharya as Habibur Rehman, INA Soldier
 Shibashish Bandopadhyay
 Prantik Banerjee as Suresh Gupta
 Pallavi Chatterjee in Lolita Bose (cameo)
 Srijit Mukherjee as Chandrachur's office boss
Indroneel Banerjee as Dr P Banerjee

Marketing 

The teaser of the film was released on 15 August 2019 by Shree Venkatesh Films. Later, the trailer of the film was released on 8 September 2019 also by Shree Venkatesh Films in Bengali and Hindi.

Release and reception 
The film released on 2 October 2019. The Times of India rated the movie 3 out of 5 stars. The film also released on OTT platforms such as Hoichoi and Amazon Prime Video at a later date

Soundtrack
The soundtrack of the film is composed by I.N.A. and D. L. Roy, whereas background music and score is done by Indraadip Dasgupta. The lyrics are by D. L. Roy and Capt. Abid Ali Mumtaz Hussain.

Awards
67th National Film Awards
Best Feature Film in Bengali - Gumnaami
Best Adapted Screenplay - Srijit Mukherji

Official Selection -Indian Film Festival of Melbourne 2020

Official Selection - South Asian International Film Festival 2019

Controversy 
The director of the film Srijit Mukherji courted a controversy in February 2019, after Netaji Subhas Chandra Bose's grand nephew Chandra Kumar Bose criticized him over portrayal of Gumnami Baba as Netaji in his upcoming film.

See also
 List of artistic depictions of Mahatma Gandhi

References

External links
 

2010s mystery films
Film directors from Kolkata
Indian National Army in fiction
Films about Subhas Chandra Bose
Films directed by Srijit Mukherji
Indian mystery films
Cultural depictions of Mahatma Gandhi
Cultural depictions of Jawaharlal Nehru
Bengali-language Indian films
2010s Bengali-language films
Indian biographical drama films
Conspiracy theories in India
Films about conspiracy theories
Best Bengali Feature Film National Film Award winners